Greenwood is a British surname, believed to be derived from the Greenwood or Greenwode settlement near Heptonstall in the metropolitan district of Calderdale in West Yorkshire.  It was the homestead of Wyomarus de Greenwode, believed to be the principal ancestor of British Greenwoods, though some claim to be of French descent.

Surname
 Al Greenwood (born 1951), American keyboard player
 Alex Greenwood (disambiguation), several people
 Alfred B. Greenwood (1811–1889) American lawyer and politician
 Alice Greenwood (1862–1935), British historian, teacher and writer
 Arthur Greenwood (1880–1954), British politician
 Arthur H. Greenwood (1880–1963), American politician
 Bob Greenwood (baseball) (1928–1994), Mexican Major League Baseball player
 Bobby Greenwood (golfer) (born 1938), American golfer
 Bobby Greenwood (American football) (born 1987), American football offensive tackle
 Sir Brian Greenwood (born 1938), British physician, biomedical researcher, and medical school professor
 Bruce Greenwood (born 1956), Canadian film actor
 Caleb Greenwood, trapper, guide, and early pioneer of the American West
 Charlotte Greenwood (1890–1977), American actress 
 Chester Greenwood (1858–1937), American inventor of earmuffs
 Clarence Greenwood alias Citizen Cope, American musician
 Colin Greenwood (rugby), South African rugby footballer
 Colin Greenwood (born 1969), British bassist for Radiohead
 Debbie Greenwood, British television presenter
 David Greenwood (born 1957), American basketball player
 Dick Greenwood (born 1940), English rugby union footballer
 Doctor Greenwood (1860–1951), Blackburn Rovers and England international footballer
 Don Greenwood (disambiguation), several people
 Duncan Greenwood (1919–1992), English playwright 
 Ed Greenwood (born 1959), Canadian library clerk, inventor of the Forgotten Realms Dungeons & Dragons campaign setting
 Elizabeth W. Greenwood (1849–1922), American social reformer
Elizabeth Greenwood (1873 – 1961), New Zealand photographer
 F. W. P. Greenwood (1797-1843), American minister
 Frederick Greenwood (1830–1909), English journalist
Grace Greenwood (1905–1979), also known as Grace Greenwood Ames and Grace Crampton, an American artist, social realist artist and muralist.
Grace Greenwood, a pseudonym for Sara Jane Lippincott (1823 –1904) American writer
 Harry Greenwood (1881–1948), English soldier, recipient of the Victoria Cross
 Harry Greenwood (actor), Australian stage and film actor
 Humphry Greenwood (1927-1995), English ichthyologist
 Irene Greenwood (1898-1992), Australian radio broadcaster and feminist and peace activist
 Ivor Greenwood (1926–1976), Australian Senator and Attorney General (1971, 1972, and 1975)
 Jack Greenwood (soccer player) (born 1999), Australian soccer player
 James Greenwood (journalist) (1832–1929), British journalist and writer
 James C. Greenwood (born 1951), American politician from the state of Pennsylvania
 Joan Greenwood (1921–1987), British actress
 John Greenwood (Puritan), (died 1593), English Puritan and Separatist
 John Greenwood (dentist) (1760–1819), George Washington's dentist, the "Father of Modern Dentistry" and Revolutionary War patriot
 John D. H. Greenwood, English composer of classical and film music
 John Greenwood (artist), colonial American artist
 John Greenwood (bus operator) (died 1851), a pioneer of omnibus services in England
 John Greenwood (executive), (1950–2008) catering executive
 John Greenwood (cricketer, born 1851) (1851–1935), cricketer 
 John Greenwood (lawyer) (1800–1871), English lawyer and sportsman
 John Greenwood, pseudonym of John Buxton Hilton, British crime writer
John Greenwood (MP), (1824-1874), British politician
 Jonathan Greenwood (born 1968), British businessman
 Jonny Greenwood (born 1971), musician and composer, most notable as a member of Radiohead
 Joseph Greenwood (died 1861), New Zealand politician and soldier
 Kathy Greenwood (born 1962), Canadian comedian
 Kerry Greenwood, Australian author of the Phryne Fisher mystery series
 Kyle Greenwood (born 1987), Canadian professional wrestler better known as Kyle O'Reilly
 L. C. Greenwood (1946–2013), American football player
 Laura Greenwood (born 1991), English actress
 Lee Greenwood (born 1942), American singer and composer
 Leonard Greenwood (classicist) (1880–1965), New Zealander classical scholar
 Leonard Greenwood (cricketer) (1899–1982), English cricketer and schoolteacher
 Major Greenwood (1880–1949), English epidemiologist and statistician
 Makayla Greenwood, American taekwondo practitioner
 Marion Greenwood (1909–1970), American social realist muralist, painter and printmaker
 Mason Greenwood (born 2001), English footballer.
 Morlon Greenwood (born 1978), American footballer
 Nick Greenwood (born 1987), American Baseball player
 Nimrod Greenwood (born 1929), Australian rower 
 Norman Greenwood (1925–2012), Australian-British chemist 
 Paul Greenwood (money manager) (born 1947), accused of securities fraud
 Peter Greenwood, Australian actor
 Robin Greenwood, American economist
 Ron Greenwood (1921–2006), manager of the England national football team
 Ross Greenwood (footballer) (born 1985), English footballer
 Ross Greenwood (journalist) (fl. 1986–2008), Australian journalist
 Sam Greenwood (footballer), English footballer
 Sarah Greenwood, English production designer
 Sarah Greenwood (artist) (1809–1889), New Zealand pioneer
 Sina Greenwood, New Zealand mathematician
 Thomas Greenwood, several people
 Walter Greenwood (1903–1974), English novelist
 Will Greenwood (born 1972), English rugby union footballer, son of Dick Greenwood

Fictional
 David Greenwood, a character from J. G. Ballard's Super-Cannes
 Deputy Clayton Thaddeus Greenwood, a regular cast character from the television show Gunsmoke
 Esther Greenwood, main character from Sylvia Plath's The Bell Jar
 Annie and Glen Greenwood, Jesse's foster parents in Free Willy

Given name 
 Greenwood LeFlore (1800–1865), an American Indian, Chief of the Choctaw tribe

Peerages
 Hamar Greenwood, 1st Viscount Greenwood (1870–1948), British noble
 Tony Greenwood, Baron Greenwood of Rossendale (1911–1982), English politician

References 

English-language surnames